Mister Philippines 2010 is a male pageant in the Philippines. The winner of Mister Philippines 2010, Raphael Cruz Carlos of Marikina, Philippines, represented the Philippines in the 5th edition of the Mister International male pageant, held at Central Park in Jakarta, Indonesia on November 20, 2010. 40 contestants competed for the title, the highest number of contestants since the pageant's inception in 2006.  Mister Philippines 2010 is a Top 15 Semi-finalist.

See also
 Manhunt International
 Mister World

External links
 Mister Philippines website

Mister International